Harry Henning (1 June 1903 – November 1986) was a Canadian boxer. He competed in the men's middleweight event at the 1924 Summer Olympics. Henning was affiliated with Classic AC in Toronto.

References

External links
 

1903 births
1986 deaths
Canadian male boxers
Olympic boxers of Canada
Boxers at the 1924 Summer Olympics
Boxers from Greater London
English emigrants to Canada
Boxers from Toronto
Middleweight boxers